Sussex is a historic county in South East England, taking its name from the Kingdom of Sussex in early Anglo-Saxon England. It is now divided into the ceremonial counties of East Sussex and West Sussex.

Animals
Sussex (chicken), a dual purpose breed created in England
Sussex cattle, a red breed from the Sussex Weald in England
Sussex Spaniel, a breed of dog developed in England
Sussex, a breed of rabbit

Places

United Kingdom
Kingdom of Sussex
History of Sussex, general history of Sussex, England
Sussex, English county
Sussex County Cricket Club, an English first-class county cricket club
University of Sussex, an English campus university situated in East Sussex

Australia
Sussex County, Western Australia

Canada
Sussex, New Brunswick
Sussex Parish, New Brunswick
Sussex Drive a major street in Ottawa, Ontario

United States

Sussex County, Delaware
Sussex, New Jersey
Sussex County, New Jersey
Sussex County, Virginia
Sussex, Wisconsin
Sussex, Wyoming

Ships
, the name of various English warships and the Royal Naval Reserve unit based in Portslade until 1994
, a passenger ferry built for the London, Brighton and South Coast Railway in 1896. Sold to France in 1914, sold to Greece in 1920 and renamed.
Sussex pledge, a pledge given by Germany in 1916 prompted by the torpedoing of the passenger ferry Sussex
 Sussex, an East Indiaman ship

Titles
Duke of Sussex, a peerage title held by Prince Harry, and Duchess of Sussex, a peerage title held by Meghan Markle, wife of Prince Harry
Earl of Sussex, a formal title created several times in the Peerages of England, Great Britain, and the United Kingdom

Other uses
Sussex Records, a former record label in Hollywood
Sussex Stakes, Group 1 flat horse race in the United Kingdom
 Sussex Publishers, a magazine publisher based in New York City that produces Psychology Today

See also